Nucleolar phosphoprotein p130 is a protein that in humans is encoded by the NOLC1 gene.

Interactions
Nucleolar phosphoprotein p130 has been shown to interact with coilin and CEBPB.

References

Further reading